Mədrəsə (Tat:Mədrəsə) is a village and municipality in the Shamakhi District of Azerbaijan. This village had a generally homogeneous Armenian population in 1918 and maintained a significant Armenian presence up until the forced exodus of Armenians from Azerbaijan in 1988. It has a population of 2,597. 

Madrasa was home to one of the last two Armeno-Tat communities in Azerbaijan, until they were expelled in the 1990s. 

It is the origin of the Madrasa grape, which is still cultivated locally and internationally for winemaking.

See also 
 Kilvar

References

External links 
 

Populated places in Shamakhi District